The  (Mass Grant us peace) is a setting of the Latin Order of Mass by the Lutheran composer Ernst Pepping for unaccompanied choir. The voices are divided from four-part choir SATB to two four-part choirs. Composed in 1948, the work was published by Bärenreiter in 1949.

Background 

Pepping was a composer who relied on Baroque models but first wrote severe works with "uncompromising dissonance". An able teacher with ties to the Confessing Church in the 1930s he wrote more compromising music and was "left alone" by the Nazis. In 1938, after a 1937 Church Music Festival in which he participated, he composed a German mass,  (German Mass: Kyrie God Father in Eternity) for a six-part mixed choir, which stressed German, following the party line.

Structure and music 

The mass is structured in five sections of different allocations of the soprano, alto, tenor and bass voices (SATB): In the following table of the movements, the markings and time signatures are taken from the score.

Pepping uses polyphony and a modal tonality to achieve a characteristic colourful sound (""). A reviewer of a recording notes that the first reactions saw a relation of the disturbing ("") setting of the text to the time of its creation – full of uncertainty and dread of the future – while Pepping refused to acknowledge a relation between his music and his life. The mass shows brittle, jagged sections ("") in complex formality and composition technique, especially in the fugues. Other sections show a rather meditative sound of only four parts.

Publication and performances 
Instead, the work was first performed in Berlin on 17 November 1948 by the Spandauer Kantorei, conducted by Gottfried Grote, then the director of the Spandauer Kirchenmusikschule.

The 24 page manuscript, including corrections and sketches, is kept in Berlin.

The first edition was by Bärenreiter in 1948. The editor Richard Baum wrote on 18 September 1948: "" (We are happy to publish this extraordinary work. [...] One will be spellbound and impressed by the contrapuntal precision work as well as by the colourful harmonies and the strong rhythm of the work.) Further editions followed in 1962 and 1996.

Selected recordings 

 Missa Dona nobis pacem, Ein jegliches hat seine Zeit, Choralsätze (Vol. 10 of the Pepping Collection), Kreuzberger Kantorei, Volkher Häusler
 , with the motets , Ein jegliches hat seine Zeit, Uns ist ein Kind geboren, Berliner Vokalensemble, Cantate, 2006

References

External links 
 Der Nachlass von Ernst Pepping Staatsbibliothek Berlin
 Matthew Troy Tresler: Ernst Pepping's "Missa Dona Nobis Pacem": A Conductor's Analysis for Performance University of Miami 2008
 Ernst Pepping / 12 September 1901 – 1 February 1981 Evangelische Kirche in Deutschland 2012
 Pepping, Ernst (1901–1981) / Missa 'Dona nobis pacem' (1948) bodensee-musikversand.de
 Die Messkompositionen von Ernst Pepping abebooks.de
 Dona nobis pacem Chorwerke = Works for choir / Ernst Pepping catalog.lib.uchicago.edu

Masses (music)
1948 compositions